Batucada is a 1967 album by Brazilian musician Walter Wanderley. Batucada refers to a fast and repetitive style of samba music played with percussion instruments and is used as an intro on the third track, "Batucada."

Critical reception 
John Bush of AllMusic described Wanderley's organ sound as "veer[ing] close to the edge where cool jazz becomes easy listening," but said that "fans of Wanderley's work on Astrud Gilberto's A Certain Smile, A Certain Sadness will enjoy this as background music."

Use in media 
The song "Os Grilos (The Crickets Sing for Anamaria)" was used in an episode of Breaking Bad titled "Hermanos."

Track listing

Personnel 

 Walter Wanderley – organ, piano
 Jose Marino, Sebastian Neto – bass
 Acy R. Lehman – cover design
 Irv Elkin – cover photo
Val Valentin – Engineering Director
 Dom Um Romao, Paulinho – Drums
 Lee Herschberg, Rudy Hill – Recording Engineer
Marcos Valle – Guitar
 Marcos Valle (tracks: side one - 3, 5; side two - 1, 4,), Walter Wanderley (tracks: side one - 2; side two - 2, 3, 5, 6) – Mixer, Arranger
 Lu Lu Ferreira – Percussion
Creed Taylor – Producer
 Claudio Miranda (tracks: side two - 5), Talya Ferro (tracks: side two - 3, 5) – Vocals

References 

1967 albums
Walter Wanderley albums
Verve Records albums